Final results for the Handball competition at the 1996 Summer Olympics.

Medal summary

See also
 Handball at the 1996 Summer Olympics – Men's tournament
 Handball at the 1996 Summer Olympics – Women's tournament

References

External links
 International Olympic Committee medal database

 
1996 Summer Olympics events
O
1996
1996 Summer Olympics